Basara is a census town in Nirmal district in the state of Telangana, India.

Geography 
Basar is located at 
It has an average elevation of 579 metres (1899 feet).

It is located on the banks of River Godavari and is famous for its Saraswathi temple in India. This temple is one of the very few temples of Goddess Saraswati in India.

Demographics 

 India census, Basar had a population of 3834. Males constitute 56% of the population and females 44%. Basara has an average literacy rate of 72%, higher than the national average of 59.5%; with 61% of the males and 39% of females literate. 16% of the population is under 6 years of age.

Rail transport 
Basara (Railway Station Code: BSX) is a railway station under Hyderabad Division of South Central Railway(SCR). It is the last Telangana station on the Secunderabad-Manmad line. The next station Dharmabad, lies in Maharashtra. The town of Basar is connected to Nizamabad, Hyderabad, Nanded, Aurangabad and Mumbai.

Saraswathi temple 
The  Gnana Saraswati Temple, Basar is a temple of Saraswati, the Hindu Goddess of Knowledge and Learning. Children are brought here to do the learning ceremony called Akshara Abyasam (means "initiation into education").

It is situated about 200 km from Hyderabad and 34.8 km from Nizamabad and 72 km from its district headquarters Nirmal. Basar is 600 km from Mumbai, by a train on the new Secunderabad – Mumbai Devagiri Express.

Godavari Harati daily Timings 6:00 to 7:30pm

Education 
The town is also home to IIIT Basara, a state university offering engineering courses that was established in 2008.

Veda vidyalayam Vedic School sri veda Bharathi peetham Sratrted from 2008

References 

Cities and towns in Nirmal district